The 1981–82 Algerian Cup is the 20th edition of the Algerian Cup. USK Alger are the defending champions, having beaten ASC Oran 2–1 in the previous season's final.

Round of 64

Round of 32

Round of 16

Quarter-finals

Semi-finals

Final

Match

References

Algerian Cup
Algerian Cup
Algerian Cup